Liu Pi-yu (born 30 January 1969) is an archer who represented Chinese Taipei.

Archery

Liu finished fifteenth at the 1988 Summer Olympic Games in the women's individual event. She also finished eleventh in the women's team event as part of the Chinese Taipei team.

At the 1990 Asian Games she won a silver medal in the women's team event.

In 1992 Liu finished 51st in the women's individual event and eleventh in the women's team event. 

At the 2000 Summer Olympic Games Liu scored 647 points and was ranked eighth in the ranking round. She defeated Katja Poulsen 161–152 and lost to Yang Jianping 157–160. Chinese Taipei were eliminated by Turkey in the quarterfinals of the women's team event.

References

External links 
 Profile on worldarchery.org

1969 births
Living people
Taiwanese female archers
Olympic archers of Taiwan
Archers at the 1988 Summer Olympics
Archers at the 1992 Summer Olympics
Archers at the 2000 Summer Olympics
Archers at the 1990 Asian Games
Asian Games medalists in archery
Asian Games silver medalists for Chinese Taipei
Medalists at the 1990 Asian Games
20th-century Taiwanese women